Fazeley is a civil parish in the district of Lichfield, Staffordshire, England.  The parish contains 21 listed buildings that are recorded in the National Heritage List for England.  All the listed buildings are designated at Grade II, the lowest of the three grades, which is applied to "buildings of national importance and special interest".  The parish includes the town of Fazeley and the surrounding area.  The Birmingham and Fazeley Canal and the Coventry Canal meet in the parish at Fazeley Junction, and four bridges crossing the former canal are listed.  The other listed buildings include houses and cottages, a farmhouse, mills and associated structures, a road bridge, a church, and three mileposts.


Buildings

References

Citations

Sources

Lichfield District
Lists of listed buildings in Staffordshire